Abdelaziz Merzougui Noureddine (born 30 August 1991) is a Spanish runner. He competed in the 3000 metres steeplechase at the 2012 and 2016 Olympics.

Competition record

Notes

References

External links 

 Abdelaziz Merzougui at RFEA
 
 

Spanish male steeplechase runners
1991 births
Living people
Olympic athletes of Spain
Athletes (track and field) at the 2012 Summer Olympics
Athletes (track and field) at the 2016 Summer Olympics
People from Guelmim
Moroccan emigrants to Spain
Naturalised citizens of Spain
Spanish sportspeople of Moroccan descent